Ulrich Munze (born 7 May 1984 in Yaoundé) is a Cameroonian retired footballer.

He played for Thai Port from 2009. The 2010 season had Munze and Pattarakorn Thanganuruck sharing the goalkeeping assignments for the Khlong Toei side. In December 2010, Thanganurat departed to Police United and Munze signed a new two-year contract.

Despite making errors in the opening game of the 2011 season, a defeat to Chonburi, he was described as "one of the better goalkeepers in the league". With the club in financial difficulties, Munze's contract was revoked in January 2012, but he was permitted to play in the 2011 Thai League Cup Final, delayed for several months because of flooding, which Buriram PEA won 2–0 to complete the domestic treble.

He joined Esan United for the 2012 season.

References

1984 births
Living people
Footballers from Yaoundé
Cameroonian footballers
Ulrich Munze
Ulrich Munze
Cameroonian expatriate sportspeople in Thailand
Expatriate footballers in Thailand
Ulrich Munze
Association football goalkeepers